Austin Haynes (born March 5, 1997) is an American politician and businessman serving as a member of the West Virginia House of Delegates from the 32nd district. He served from 2020 to 2022.

Background 
Haynes was born and raised in Beckley, West Virginia and graduated from Oak Hill High School. After graduating, Haynes became a licensed insurance agent. He was elected to the West Virginia House of Delegates in November 2020 and assumed office on December 1, 2020. In 2022, Haynes was accused by multiple women of sexual harassment. Later that year, he was defeated by David Pritt for election to the 50th district.

Electoral history

References 

1997 births
Living people
Politicians from Beckley, West Virginia
Republican Party members of the West Virginia House of Delegates